Javād Ma'roufi , (1912 in Tehran – December 7, 1993, in Tehran) was an Iranian composer and pianist.

Biography
Javād Ma'roufi was born in Tehran to the musician father Musā Ma'roufi and mother Ozrā Ma'roufi (or Ezra Ma'roufi) who both were distinguished pupils of Darvish Khan, a renowned music master of the time in Iran. Javād Ma'roufi lost his mother at young age, and consequently grew up in his paternal family. He was taught in music first by his father, playing both the tar and the violin. At fourteen he attended the Academy of Music of which Ali-Naqi Vaziri was the director and where he studied the piano under the music master Tatiana Kharatian (تاتیانا خاراطیان). During this period he studied works by Chopin, Mozart, Beethoven and Bach. 

Ma'roufi died in the morning of Tuesday 7 December 1993 (16 Āzar 1372 AH) in a hospital in Tehran.

Notes

External links
 Official Website of Ostād Javād Ma'roufi
 Javad Maroufi webpage at Rouhollah Khaleghi Artistic Center (Kanun-e  Honari-e Rouhollah Khaleghi )
An article about Javad Maroufi
Iran Daily article about Javad Maroufi (PDF)

1912 births
1993 deaths
Iranian composers
Iranian pianists
Musicians from Tehran
20th-century pianists
20th-century composers